The Day After is a 1909 American short silent drama film directed by D. W. Griffith and starring Blanche Sweet. A print of the film survives in the film archive of the Library of Congress.

Plot
Mr. and Mrs. Hilton decided to give a big New Year's Eve party. They both agree to control their drinking, but as the guests arrive and the party continues both get drunk. The next day Mr. Hilton, feeling guilty for being weak, fears to confront his wife, until he finds out she was guilty as well.

Cast
 Arthur V. Johnson as Mr. Hilton
 Blanche Sweet as The New Year
 Marion Leonard as Mrs. Hilton
 George Nichols as A Friend
 Linda Arvidson as Servant
 Frank Evans as Party Guest
 James Kirkwood as Party Guest
 Henry Lehrman as Party Guest
 Jeanie MacPherson as Party Guest
 W. Chrystie Miller as The Old Year
 Anthony O'Sullivan as Party Guest
 Gertrude Robinson as Party Guest
 Paul Scardon as Party Guest (unconfirmed)
 Mack Sennett as Party Guest
 Henry B. Walthall as Party Guest
 Dorothy West as Party Guest

See also
 List of American films of 1909
 D. W. Griffith filmography
 Blanche Sweet filmography

References

External links

1909 films
Silent American drama films
American silent short films
Biograph Company films
American black-and-white films
1909 drama films
1909 short films
Films directed by D. W. Griffith
Films directed by Frank Powell
Surviving American silent films
1900s American films